Dmitre Razgulajevs (born November 19, 1996) is a Canadian ice dancer, who currently competes with Molly Lanaghan. 

With his former partner Mackenzie Bent, he was the 2016 Canadian national junior champion and finished in the top ten at the 2016 World Junior Championships.

Personal life 
Dmitre Razgulajevs was born on November 19, 1996 in Boston, Massachusetts. He moved to Canada with his parents, Irina and Juris Razgulajevs, in 1999. His father competed in ice dancing for the Soviet Union, Latvia, Uzbekistan, and Japan. He maintains a close friendship with a group of people he’s known since Grade 5: Kevin Bonilla, Madison Marple, and Kirk Schlichting.

Career

Early career 
Razgulajevs began skating in 2001. His first ice dancing partner was Katie Desveaux. The two finished fourth on the novice level at the 2012 Canadian Championships and began appearing as juniors the following season. At Nationals, they were 7th in 2013 and 11th in 2014. Their partnership came to an end in 2014.

Partnership with Bent 
Razgulajevs teamed up with Mackenzie Bent in the spring of 2015. Making their international debut, they won the silver medal at the 2015–16 ISU Junior Grand Prix event in Colorado Springs, Colorado. They finished fifth at their second JGP assignment in Logroño, Spain. The two missed the Skate Canada Challenge in December because Razgulajevs experienced vertigo, but the following month they won the junior gold medal at the 2016 Canadian Championships. Ranked ninth in both segments, they finished ninth at the 2016 World Junior Championships in Debrecen, Hungary.

Having aged out of juniors, Bent/Razgulajevs moved up to the senior level in the 2016–17 season. They placed fourth at the Lake Placid Ice Dance International.

Partnership with Lanaghan 
Following the end of his partnership with Bent, Razgulajevs formed a new partnership with English ice dancer Molly Lanaghan.  The two decided to compete for Canada.  They debuted internationally at the 2017 CS Warsaw Cup, where they placed tenth.  They went on to win a bronze medal at the 2018 Skate Canada Challenge, qualifying them for the 2018 Canadian Championships, where they placed seventh.

Beginning the 2018–19 season, they placed sixth at the 2018 CS Autumn Classic International and repeated as bronze medalists at the 2019 Skate Canada Challenge. The pair placed fifth at the 2020 Canadian Championships. They also placed fifth at the 2020 Bavarian Open.

Lanaghan/Razgulajevs were assigned to make their Grand Prix debut at the 2020 Skate Canada International, but the event was cancelled as a result of the coronavirus pandemic.

2021-22 season 

Lanaghan/Razgulajevs began their season with eleventh and eighth-place finishes at the 2021 CS Cup of Austria and the 2021 CS Warsaw Cup, respectively. They ended their season by finishing eighth at the 2022 Canadian Figure Skating Championships.

2022-23 season 

Lanaghan/Razgulajevs opened their season by finishing fourth at the 2022 CS Nebelhorn Trophy. They then went on to make their Grand Prix debut at the 2022 Grand Prix de France, where they finished in tenth place.

Programs

With Lanaghan

With Bent

With Desveaux

Competitive highlights 
CS: Challenger Series; JGP: Junior Grand Prix

With Lanaghan

With Bent

With Desveaux

References

External links 
 
 

1996 births
Canadian male ice dancers
Living people
Figure skaters from Boston
American emigrants to Canada
21st-century Canadian people